Zdravko Krstanović (Siverić, FNR Yugoslavia, nowadays Croatia, 30 July 1950) is a Serbian poet, prose writer, critic, book editor, literature historian, playwright and journalist.

Biography 
He attended high school in Knin and Split. He graduated from the Yugoslav languages and literature and Comparative literature at the Faculty of Philosophy in Zagreb. Until October 1991 he lived in Split, Croatia, and since then lives in Belgrade, Serbia. 

He was an editor at the "Logos" publishing house in Split, had a column "Records from Insomnia /Zapisi iz nesanice/"  and regular book reviews in Split newspaper Slobodna Dalmacija, as well as in the Zagreb magazine Oko. From 1990 to 1993 he edited the magazine Srpska zora. From 1990 to 2002 he was a journalist in the Belgrade newspaper Politika Ekspres.

He published his first poem in 1962 in Sarajevo children magazine Vesela sveska, and his first story in 1971 in Zagreb newspaper Večernji List.

As an elementary school pupil he contributed in Male novine, Kekec, Plavi vjesnik, Galeb, Borba, Ilustrovana politika, Slobodna Dalmacija and other periodicals.

In high school he published in Polet and Vidik. As a student, he collaborated with the Serbian cultural society "Prosvjeta" and published a number of literary articles in the journal Prosvjeta and the journal Novi ljetopis.

He has published poetry and stories in Republika, Književne novine, Politika, NIN, Start, Forum, Pitanja, Savremenik, Polja, Letopis Matice srpske, Mogućnosti, Oslobođenje, Odjek, Stvaranje, Stremljenje, Srpski književni glasnik, Ovdje, Revija and many other periodicals. 

He is also a prolific ethnographer of Serbian folklore heritage.

Works 
He is the author of numerous poems and articles, as well as monodrama The man on the world, a drop on the leaf /Čovek na svitu, kap na listu/ in two versions (1979 and 1980), TV drama The old man /Starac/ (1983) and a screenplay for the short film Paradise Garden /Rajski vrt/ (1990).

He edited Libar by Miljenko Smoje (1981), Erotic folk songs / Erotske narodne pjesme/ (1984), an anthology of Serbian folk poetry The golden foam from the sea /Zlatna pjena od mora/ (1990), Dubrovnik's elegies /Dubrovačke elegije/ by Lujo Vojnović (1997), The Feast /Gozba/ by Pavle Solarić (1999) and A wonderful fountain – An anthology of Serbian poetry from Baranja to Boka Kotorska (2002).

His book Tales from Hades /Priče iz Hada/ has been translated into several languages, from 1992 to 2000, and had twelve editions.

Poetry books 
 Principality of fish /Kneževina riba/ (1974)<ref>Maleš, Branko. [https://www.ceeol.com/search/article-detail?id=557298 Mitsko-religiozna svijest: prijevod smisla u formu, historije u prirodu /Mythical-religious consciousness: translating the meaning in form, history in nature/], Polja, Issue No: 270-271, Novi Sad, 1981, pp 350–353 (Serbian)</ref>
 House /Kuća / (1978)
 Water syllables /Slogovi od vode/ (1981)
 Dynamite /Dinamit/ (1982)
 Reverse master /Obrnuti majstor/ (1984)
 Other mountains /Druge planine/ (1989)
 Songs on the road /Pjesme na drumu/ (1994)
 Selected poems /Izabrane pesme/ (1995)
 Jesus Christ in the field /Isus Hrist u polju/ (1996)
 The dew manuscript /Rukopis iz rose/ (1997)
 Soon, a daybreak /Uskoro, sviće/ (1998)
 Room without a mirror /Soba bez ogledala/ (2000)
 Selected poems /Izabrane pjesme/ (2008)

 Collections of lyrical prose 
 The book made of dream and wake /Knjiga od sna i jave/ (1998)
 Chopin's water /Šopenova voda/ (2003)

 Prizes and awards 
Krstanović has been represented in numerous literary anthologies and collections, and translated into ten languages.

He has won several literary awards and has received the "Filip Višnjić" Award for "the extraordinary contribution to the culture of the Serbian people" in 2002.

 Literature  
 Jovanović, Aleksandar. Narrating horror /Pripovedanje užasa/" in: Tales from Hades /Priče iz Hada/], 1994. (Serbian)

 References 

 External sources 
 Krstanović, Zdravko. Tales from Hades /Priče iz Hada/, 1994. (Serbian)
 The golden foam from the sea — An anthology of folk poetry of Serbs of Croatia /Zlatna pjena od mora — Narodne pjesme Srba u Hrvatskoj/, 1990. (Serbian)
 Krstanović, Zdravko. The divine flow of anciently young letter /Božansko strujanje drevno mladog slova/'' (Serbian)
 Solarić, Pavle. (1779–1821): The feast /Gozba/ (Serbian)

1950 births
Living people
People from Drniš
Serbs of Croatia
Serbian writers
Serbian literary critics
Literary critics of Serbian
Serbian male poets
Serbian journalists
Serbian screenwriters
Male screenwriters
Serbian dramatists and playwrights
Serbian literary historians
Serbian literary editors